Josip Torbar may refer to:
 Josip Torbar (scientist) (1824–1900), Croatian natural scientist, educator and politician
 , Croatian politician, father of Josip Torbar born in 1922
 Josip Torbar (politician, born 1922), Croatian politician